Bayshore Boulevard  is a waterfront road on Hillsborough Bay in South Tampa, Florida. The  bike lane, a linear park, and the Bayshore Greenway Trail provide scenic views of urban Tampa and the water. The sidewalk's conveniences include benches, a water fountain, bicycle parking, a city marina, and workout stations.

References

External links
A black and white, aerial photo taken around 1970 showing Bayshore Blvd in Tampa
Running Away: Tampa, FL

Transportation in Tampa, Florida
Landmarks in Tampa, Florida
Roads in Tampa, Florida